The Winchester Model 54 is a bolt-action rifle manufactured by the Winchester Repeating Arms Company. The 54 was the first successful production run civilian centerfire bolt action for Winchester.

Using a Mauser 98-type action, the Model 54 was produced until 1936 when, with some modifications, it was reintroduced as the Winchester Model 70. The Model 54 had a relatively heavy two stage trigger pull, which was greatly improved in the Model 70.

Standard chamberings included the .22 Hornet, .220 Swift, .250-3000 Savage, .257 Roberts, .270 Winchester, 30-30 Winchester, .30-06 Springfield, 7x57mm Mauser, 7.65x53mm Argentine, and 9x57mm Mauser. Special order chamberings were made in .25-35 Winchester, .32 Winchester Special, .35 Whelen, and 38-55 Winchester.

Intended for use with open or aperture sights, the bolt throw makes the addition of a scope difficult as it was introduced prior to the popularity of telescopic sight.

See also 
Winchester rifle
T. C. Johnson

References 

 Bolt Action Rifles, De Haas and Zwoll, p. 576

External links 
 Exploded view

Bolt-action rifles of the United States
Winchester Repeating Arms Company firearms